= 1942–43 South African cricket season =

The 1942–43 South African cricket season saw only two first-class games. South Africa was involved in the Second World War and with the war came austerity and cricket matches played for the Currie Cup were considered too frivolous to be played in a country at war. There were only three first-class games played in South Africa during it. The two games played in 1942–43.

== The matches ==
=== Air Force XI v Rest of South Africa (26–27 December) ===
Rest of South Africa beat Air Force XI by 5 wickets

Scorecard

=== First South African Division v Rest of South Africa (13–14 March) ===
First South African Division drew with Rest of South Africa

Scorecard
